Rojibeg is a village in the Bhopal district of Madhya Pradesh, India. It is located in the Huzur tehsil and the Phanda block.

Demographics 
According to the 2011 census of India, Rojibeg had 38 households. The effective literacy rate (i.e. the literacy rate of population excluding children aged 6 and below) was 26.72%.

References 

Villages in Huzur tehsil